Eoxenopoides is an extinct genus of prehistoric frogs. It is known from Banke, a Maastrichtian/Selandian crater lake mudstone in South Africa.

See also
 Prehistoric amphibian
 List of prehistoric amphibians

References

Prehistoric frogs
Taxa named by Sidney H. Haughton
Fossil taxa described in 1931